Horacena E. Tate (born May 8, 1956) is an American politician who currently serves in the Georgia State Senate, representing the 38th District in Fulton County.

Biography

Tate was born in Griffin, Georgia, but raised in Atlanta.  In 1977, she obtained a Bachelor of Science degree from the University of Georgia.  A Master's degree in Educational Administration followed from Atlanta University in 1988.  She received a Ph.D. in 1992 from Clark-Atlanta University, also in Educational Administration.

Tate was first elected to the Georgia State Senate in 1998. She currently serves on the following committees:

Appropriations
Health and Human Services
Retirement
State and Local Governmental Operations

Awards and recognition
2003 Leader of Distinction Award, Alpha Kappa Alpha sorority
2001 Public Servant Award, Coalition on Hunger
2000 Distinguished Public Servant Award, Martin Luther King Jr. Drive Merchant Association
2000 Legislator of the Year Award, National Association of Social Workers - Georgia Chapter
2000 Leader of Distinction Award, Alpha Kappa Alpha sorority
1999 Leader of Distinction Award, Alpha Kappa Alpha sorority

References

External links
 Profile at the Georgia State Senate
Archive of Senator Tate's Biography at the Official Website of the General Assembly of Georgia

Living people
Democratic Party Georgia (U.S. state) state senators
1956 births
People from Griffin, Georgia
People from Fulton County, Georgia
University of Georgia alumni
Clark Atlanta University alumni
Women state legislators in Georgia (U.S. state)
21st-century American politicians
21st-century American women politicians
20th-century American politicians
20th-century American women politicians